Nur al-Din Muhammad Abd-Allah ibn Hakim ‘Ayn al-Mulk Qurayshi Shirazi was a mid 17th century Persian physician from Shiraz, Fars, Iran.

He is best known for his large synopsis of 'Yunani' (Greco-Roman medicine as inherited by Islam) and Hindu medicine that was entitled Zakhira-i Dara-Shukuhi and dedicated to the Mughal emperor Shah Jahan's son Dara Shikuh, who ruled as emperor from 1657-9CE.

He also composed in 1628 CE a Persian pharmacological dictionary titled Alfaz al-adwiyah which he had dedicated to Shah Jahan himself, of which the National Library of Medicine has a copy.

See also
List of Iranian scientists

Sources
C.A. Storey, Persian Literature: A Bio-Bibliographical Survey. Volume II, Part 2: E. Medicine (London: Royal Asiatic Society, 1971), pp 255–8 no 439
Fateme Keshavarz, A Descriptive and Analytical Catalogue of Persian Manuscripts in the Library of the Wellcome Institute for the History of Medicine (London: Wellcome Institute for the History of Medicine, 1986), pp 78–80, no 4.

17th-century Iranian physicians
16th-century births
17th-century deaths
17th-century Iranian writers